The 1946 NAIA basketball tournament was held in March at Municipal Auditorium in Kansas City, Missouri. The 9th annual NAIA basketball tournament featured 32 teams playing in a single-elimination format.

The championship game was won by Southern Illinois when the Salukis defeated the Indiana State Sycamores, 49-40.

Central Missouri State, the original National Champions, and first back-to-back National Champions, played in their final NAIA tournament, although they remained an NAIA member for another decade, leaving in the mid 1950s to join the NCAA. The Mules appeared seven tournaments recording an overall record of 13 wins and 6 losses. The Mules won two National Championships in 1937 and  1938 and finishing in 4th place in 1942.

Awards and honors
Many of the records set by the 1945 tournament have been broken, and many of the awards were established much later:
Leading scorer est. 1963
Leading rebounder est. 1963
Charles Stevenson Hustle Award est. 1958
Coach of the Year est. 1954
Player of the Year est. 1994.

Bracket

  * denotes overtime.

See also
 1946 NCAA basketball tournament
 1946 National Invitation Tournament

References

NAIA Men's Basketball Championship
Tournament
NAIA Basketball Tournament